The Cunliffe-Owen Concordia was a 1940s British twin-engined small airliner built by Cunliffe-Owen Aircraft.

History
The Concordia was 12-seat medium range transport aircraft. A separate luggage compartment could accommodate 45 lbs of luggage per passenger. Designed by W. Garrow-Fisher and built at Eastleigh, Hampshire in 1947. The prototype aircraft Y-0222 was first flown at Eastleigh on 19 May 1947. A second aircraft G-AKBE was displayed at the 1947 SBAC Show at Radlett and made an extensive European sales tour.

Work was suspended on 18 November 1947 on a production batch of six aircraft. These included one aircraft for the Nawab of Bhopal and two for British European Airways. Air Malta placed an order for one example in early 1947. It was concluded there was not a market for the aircraft. Shortly afterward the company ceased to work in the aircraft industry.

The Belgian COGEA company styled themselves exclusive agents for the Concordia for Belgium and its then colony Congo; no results are documented.

Specifications

References
Notes

Further reading

Abandoned civil aircraft projects of the United Kingdom
1940s British airliners
Concordia